"In Silence" is the eighth single by Japanese rock band Luna Sea, released on July 15, 1996. It reached number 2 on the Oricon Singles Chart, and charted for nine weeks. In 1996, it was certified Gold by the RIAJ for sales over 200,000. The song's promotional video features a young Eiji Wentz. The song was used as the theme song for the first season of the Japanese dub of the American television drama Chicago Hope.

Track listing
All songs written and composed by Luna Sea.

"In Silence" - 5:35Originally composed by Sugizo. Features backing vocals by singer Akino Arai.
"Ray" - 7:33Originally composed by Sugizo.

References

Luna Sea songs
1996 singles
1996 songs